A list of films produced in the United Kingdom in 1973 (see 1973 in film):

1973

See also
1973 in British music
1973 in British radio
1973 in British television
1973 in the United Kingdom

References

External links

1973
Films
Lists of 1973 films by country or language